Kazuomi Ota (born 1 July 1986 in Kitakyushu) is a Japanese weightlifter. He competed at the 2012 Summer Olympics in the +105 kg event.

References

Japanese male weightlifters
Olympic weightlifters of Japan
Weightlifters at the 2012 Summer Olympics
1986 births
Living people
Weightlifters at the 2010 Asian Games
Weightlifters at the 2014 Asian Games
Sportspeople from Kitakyushu
Asian Games competitors for Japan
20th-century Japanese people
21st-century Japanese people